Team City of Gods are an American basketball team that has participated in The Basketball Tournament (TBT), a winner-take-all single-elimination tournament. The team advanced to the TBT 2015 semifinals, beating tournament favorite Boeheim's Army before falling to eventual tournament champions Overseas Elite.

The team played in the Northeast Region of the tournament in 2015, their first year of existence. The team was coached by Joe Connelly III, a former player development coach for the Washington Wizards based in Baltimore, Maryland. City of Gods was managed by former George Washington basketball player Lafonte Johnson. The team featured five players with experience in the National Basketball Association (NBA).

History  
Team City of Gods was founded in 2015, primarily by Joe Connelly III, who had previously worked as the development coach for Washington Wizards of the National Basketball Association. Connelly, currently a professional basketball trainer based in his hometown of Baltimore, Maryland, has experience coaching public school teams, at recreation centers, and in the Amateur Athletic Union. He is the older brother of both Denver Nuggets general manager Tim Connelly and Phoenix Suns assistant general manager Tim Connelly.

Connelly chose the team's players primarily because he had connections with each of them. One player, Michael Sweetney, said that "Joe Connelly pretty much put the whole team together". Connelly and general manager Lafonte Johnson, a former college basketball player for UNLV and George Washington, helped gain fans by campaigning on Twitter and other social media websites. Joe Connelly came up with the team name, using a popular Baltimore clothing brand. Connelly also liked how the name of the clothing brand sounded like reaching for greatness and being great. The name helped make the team more popular, which helped gain support and votes in order to enter the basketball tournament and a chance to win $1million dollars.

Logo and uniforms

Players

References

External links 
Official team page

Basketball teams in Baltimore
The Basketball Tournament teams
Basketball teams established in 2015